Joseph McLaughlin may refer to:

 Joe McLaughlin (footballer) (born 1960), Scottish professional footballer
 Joe McLaughlin (sportswriter) (1934–1997), American sports-writer from Texas
 Joe McLaughlin (American football) (born 1957), American football player
 Joseph M. McLaughlin (1933–2013), American academic and US federal appellate court judge
 Joseph McLaughlin (Pennsylvania politician) (1867–1926), US Representative from Pennsylvania
 Joseph R. McLaughlin (Michigan politician) (1851–1932), Lieutenant Governor of Michigan
 Joseph R. McLaughlin (North Carolina politician) (born 1954), US Airforce graduate and politician from North Carolina
 Joseph Frank McLaughlin, American judge in Hawaii
 Joseph McLaughlin (1922–1999), Irish tenor better known as Josef Locke